Stanley House is a historic home located at Lima in Livingston County, New York. It was built about 1857 and is a two-story, Greek Revival style frame dwelling with clapboard siding and a rubblestone foundation faced with roughly hewn limestone blocks. Also on the property are a contributing 19th century carriage house and privy.

It was listed on the National Register of Historic Places in 1989.

References

Houses on the National Register of Historic Places in New York (state)
Greek Revival houses in New York (state)
Houses completed in 1857
Houses in Livingston County, New York
National Register of Historic Places in Livingston County, New York
1857 establishments in New York (state)